Lysippus is a crater on Mercury. Its name was adopted by the International Astronomical Union in 1976. Lysippus is named for the Greek sculptor Lysippos, who lived in the 4th century BCE.

Lysippus it is one of 110 peak ring basins on Mercury.

To the north of Lysippus is Thoreau crater, and to the east is Vieira da Silva crater.

References

Impact craters on Mercury